Sevvostlag (North-Eastern Corrective Labor Camps)  was a system of forced labor camps set up to satisfy the workforce requirements of the Dalstroy construction trust in the Kolyma region in April 1932. Organizationally being part of Dalstroy and under the management of the Labor and Defence Council of Sovnarkom, these camps were formally subordinated to OGPU later the NKVD directorate of the Far Eastern Krai. On March 4, 1938 Sevvostlag was resubordinated to the NKVD GULAG. In 1942 it was resubordinated back to Dalstroy. In 1949 it was renamed to the Directorate of Dalstroy Corrective Labor Camps (Управление исправительно-трудовых лагерей Дальстроя). In 1953, after the death of Joseph Stalin, with the reform of the Soviet penal system, it was again resubordinated to Gulag and later reformed into the Directorate of Far Eastern Corrective Labor Camps Управление Северо-восточных исправительно-трудовых лагерей, УСВИТЛ (USVITL).

The inmates served on all Dalstroy projects, the major ones being gold mining and road construction, including the infamous Kolyma Highway.

Structure and prisoners
Sevvostlag was the sole administration for the whole system of the forced labor of Dalstroy. The numerous labor camps usually mentioned for Kolyma and Dalstroy were formally referred to as subcamps ("camp subdivisions", лагерные подразделения) attached (but not subordinated) to the corresponding production units. Until the 1950s the only exceptions were camps on the periphery of Kolyma, which while servicing Dalstroy, were either detached from or attached to Sevostlag at various times.

From 1945–1949 there was a subcamp for Japanese prisoners of war in Magadan, which held 3,479 prisoners by January 1, 1949.

Notable inmates
Nina Gagen-Torn, Russian poet, writer, historian and ethnographer
Pavlo Khrystiuk,  Ukrainian cooperator, historian, journalist, political activist, and statesman
Sergei Korolev, lead Soviet rocket engineer and spacecraft designer
Osip Mandelshtam, poet 
Vladimir Narbut, poet
Boris Ruchyov, poet (1938–1947)
Varlam Shalamov, author of the Kolyma Tales
Vsevolod Zaderatsky,  Russian and Ukrainian composer and pianist

Management and headquarters 

The management was initially headquartered in the Srednikan settlement (now Ust-Srednekan, Magadan Oblast). It was moved to the Nagayev Bay, and eventually to Magadan.

Prominent camp officials included: 
 Rodion Vaskov (Родион И. Васьков) – (11.03.32 – 09.28.34)
 Ivan Filippov (Иван Г. Филиппов) – captain of state security (09.28.34 – 12.21.37)
  (Гаранин, Степан Николаевич)  – (12.21.37 – 09.27.38)
 A. Vishnevetsky (А. А. Вишневецкий) – captain of state security (02.16.40 – 02.19.41)
 Yevekl Drabkin (Евекль Иделевич Драбкин) – colonel of state security (05.19.41 – 03.13.45)
 N. Titov (Н.Ф. Титов) – Major General (03.13.45 – 07.27.48)
 A. Derevianko (А. А. Деревянко) – Major General (07.27.48 – 05.03.51)

See also

Notes
Specific

General
 Дальстрой 
 Золотодобыча на Колыме

Link
 Documentary  *** GOLD*** - lost in Siberia  by Gerard Jacobs and Theo Uittenbogaard (VPRO/The Netherlands/1994) was filmed in the summer of 1993 in Magadan, along the Road of Bones, through Ust-Umshug and Susuman and at the Sverovostok Zoloto gold mine, Siberia, by the first foreign film crew ever, visiting the Kolyma District -which had been under control of the Soviet secret service, under the company name Dalstroj, for over 60 years.

Buildings and structures in Magadan Oblast
Camps of the Gulag